The 2006 Dr. Pepper Big 12 Championship Game was held on December 2, 2006, at Arrowhead Stadium in Kansas City, Missouri, and pit the divisional winners from the Big 12 Conference: the Nebraska Cornhuskers, winner of the North division against the Oklahoma Sooners, winner of the South division.  The  Sooners defeated the Cornhuskers, 21-7. This was the first time the two teams had ever met in the Big 12 conference championship game.

Regular season

After the Championship game
The Sooners went on to play in the Fiesta Bowl and lose to Boise State Broncos in one of the most historic upsets in BCS and bowl game history, not only because of the winner, but the way in which Boise State used a trick play to win the game.

See also

References

External links
 ESPN.com recap of the game

2000s in Kansas City, Missouri
Big 12 Championship Game
2006 in sports in Missouri
Big 12 Championship Game
December 2006 sports events in the United States
Nebraska Cornhuskers football games
Oklahoma Sooners football games
Sports competitions in Kansas City, Missouri